The Southeastern Indiana Conference was an IHSAA-sanctioned conference that existed from 1930 to 1958.

History 
The conference was formed in the fall of 1930 with charter members Aurora, Austin, Batesville, Brookville, Brownstown, Corydon, French Lick, Madison, North Vernon, Oolitic, Orleans, Osgood, Paoli, Salem, Scottsburg, and Versailles. Invitations were also made to Edinburgh, Jeffersonville, Milroy, Mitchell, New Albany, Seymour, and West Baden, but they were apparently rejected. To balance out the East and West divisions, the league took in Lawrenceburg, Milan, Rising Sun, and Vevay. This put both divisions at 10 members each. French Lick and Oolitic left in 1939 to help found the Southwestern Indiana Conference, while Brookville did the same a year later to form the Whitewater Valley Conference. Rising Sun also left, helping form the Laughery Valley Conference in 1941. Milan was expelled in 1942 for rules violations. Mitchell joined in 1950.

The conference began to fracture in the 1950s. Osgood and Versailles would split off to form the Ohio River Valley Conference in 1952 (along with former members Milan and Rising Sun), with Vevay following the next year. The next wave came in 1956, as Aurora, Batesville, and Lawrenceburg left to create the Eastern Indiana Athletic Conference. Seven of the ten remaining schools would form the Mid-Southern Conference two years later, ending the conference. Orleans was able to land in the Southern Monon Conference, but Madison and North Vernon would have to survive as independents. Today, in addition to the EIAC, MSC, and ORVC, former SEIC members also compete in the Hoosier Hills and Patoka Lake conferences.

Membership

 Played concurrently in SEIC and FCC 1930-40.
 School was Corydon until 1950. Played concurrently in SEIC and HCC 1930-58.

Divisions
The SEIC used an East-West division format from its inception until the 1953-54 school year, when the conference was reduced to 13 teams. Madison often ended up moving between the two divisions, though after the ORVC schools left, both Madison and Scottsburg ended up in the Eastern Division.

References

Indiana high school athletic conferences
High school sports conferences and leagues in the United States
Indiana High School Athletic Association disestablished conferences